Wallace Richard Wirths (7 July 1921 – 6 July 2002), was a former Westinghouse executive, politician, author, newspaper columnist and radio commentator, who was a benefactor of Upsala College in East Orange, New Jersey.

Biography
Born in Englewood, New Jersey on 7 July 1921, Wirths attended Lehigh University in Bethlehem, Pennsylvania and served in the United States Navy during peacetime. In 1957, Wirths moved to Wantage Township, in Sussex County, in northwestern New Jersey where he became active in local politics.  The author of three books, Wirths wrote a column for The New Jersey Herald and was a frequent conservative radio commentator, with his segment "Wally Wirths Candidly Speaking" on WSUS.  He was a public relations executive with Westinghouse Corporation until his retirement in 1979.

Wirths Campus of Upsala College
Before it closed in 1995, Upsala College operated a  satellite campus in Wantage Township which it named the "Wirths Campus."  Wirths donated his family's farm to the college in 1978.  The school had considered moving to Sussex County as East Orange's crime problem and social conditions deteriorated in the 1970s but chose to remain committed to East Orange. However, declining enrollment and financial difficulties forced the school to close. The Wirths family bought back their farm in Wantage from the college for $75,000.

Wirths received an honorary doctor of law degree from Upsala College.

Personal life
Wirths died on 6 July 2002 from complications of a stroke he suffered in 1996.  He was buried in Clove Cemetery in Wantage.

One of Wirths' four adopted sons is New Jersey politician Harold J. Wirths, the state's current commissioner of the New Jersey Department of Labor and Workforce Development.

Works
 1985: Democracy: Panacea or Pandemonium
 1993: Democracy-- The Myth, the Reality: A Primer on the True Nature of Our Democratic Republic
 1996: The Human Race Stinks: Perspectives of an Iconoclast

References

People from Sussex County, New Jersey
New Jersey Republicans
County commissioners in New Jersey
American radio personalities
1921 births
2002 deaths
20th-century American politicians
20th-century American male writers